Artyom Vladimirovich Potapov (Артём Владимирович Потапов), known until 2022 as Artyom Leonov; born 28 June 1994) is a Russian football goalkeeper who plays for Surkhon Termez.

Club career
Potapov made his debut in the Russian Second Division for FC Akademiya Tolyatti on 24 April 2011 in a game against FC Oktan Perm.

Alashkert
On 23 February 2023, Armenian Premier League club Alashkert announced the signing of Potapov

Ararat Yerevan
On 3 June 2022, Ararat Yerevan announced the signing of Potapov. On 10 December 2022, Ararat Yerevan announced that Potapov had left by mutual consent.

Personal life
In 2022 he changed his last name from Leonov to Potapov.

Career statistics

Club

References

External links

1994 births
People from Orenburg
Sportspeople from Orenburg Oblast
Living people
Russian footballers
Association football goalkeepers
Russia youth international footballers
Russia under-21 international footballers
Russian expatriate footballers
Expatriate footballers in Croatia
Expatriate footballers in Belarus
Expatriate footballers in Kazakhstan
Expatriate footballers in Armenia
Expatriate footballers in Uzbekistan
Belarusian Premier League players
FC Krasnodar-2 players
FC Ufa players
NK Lučko players
FC Mordovia Saransk players
PFC Krylia Sovetov Samara players
FC SKA-Khabarovsk players
FC Torpedo Minsk players
FC Minsk players
FC Kaisar players
FC Alashkert players
Surkhon Termez players